Tommy Donbavand (28 November 1967 – 14 May 2019) was an English actor, teacher and writer from Liverpool, best known for his books and comics for children, such as Scream Street. He often wrote under pseudonyms.

Background 
Donbavand had a varied career which saw him working as a clown, a holiday camp entertainer and a performer in Buddy - The Buddy Holly Story in London's West End.  He also ran acting and writing classes, wrote, produced and directed a number of theatre productions, and wrote a series of non-fiction books in his Quick Fixes for Bored Kids series.

Career
In 2006, Donbavand began writing as B. Strange for the Too Ghoul For School book series, published by Egmont.  This led to his own series – Scream Street – being picked up by Walker Books.  The first in this series of thirteen novels – Scream Street: Fang of the Vampire – was published in October 2008. In 2015, it was adapted into a animated television series, produced by Coolabi Productions, which began airing on CBBC. Donbavand wrote a number of episodes. A second series was confirmed in 2020.

In April 2013, his Doctor Who novel Shroud of Sorrow featuring the Eleventh Doctor and Clara Oswald was published by BBC Books. He also co-wrote the Shadow Vanguard series of science fiction books under the pseudonym of Tom Dublin.

Donbavand wrote for The Beano comic, initially starting with strips for Calamity James, Gnasher and Gnipper and The Bash Street Kids. Six months later, he was made the main writer for The Bash Street Kids. He also worked on the Badger Graphic Novels range, aimed at struggling readers.

He  wrote another children's series, Fangs, Vampire Spy, as well as the writing handbooks 13 Steps to Beating Writer's Block in 2015, 101 Stunning Story Starters in 2017, and 101 Quick and Quirky Questions in 2018.

Cancer and death
In March 2016, Donbavand was diagnosed with inoperable, stage four throat cancer. He died from the illness in May 2019.

In July 2020, his Doctor Who short audio play, What Lurks Down Under was released posthumously by Big Finish Productions as part of Time Apart, starring Peter Davison as the Fifth Doctor.

Bibliography

 Too Ghoul For School (2007–2008)
 Scream Street (2008–2011)
Wolf (2011)
Uniform (2012)
Doctor Who
 Shroud of Sorrow (2013)
 Time Apart (2020)
Tommy Donbavand's Funny Shorts
Teen Reads
Home
Kidnap
Ward 13
Dead Scared
Just Bite
Copy Cat
Raven
Gems
The Terrible Tale of Melody Doom
Once Upon a Time... 

Fangs, Vampire Spy (2013–2014)
Operation: Golden Bum
Codename: The Tickler
Assignment: Royal Rescue
Target: Nobody
Project: Wolf World
Mission: Lullaby
Space Hoppers
Time Trek
13 Steps to Beating Writer's Block: Free your creativity today! (2015)
Snow-Man (2016)
101 Stunning Story Starters (2017)
101 Quick and Quirky Questions (2018)
Shadow Vanguard (2018–2019)
Gravity Storm
Lunar Crisis
Immortality Curse
Ultimate Payback

References

External links
 
 Scream Street official website

1967 births
2019 deaths
21st-century English male writers
21st-century British novelists
British male novelists
British science fiction writers
English children's writers
English comics writers
English horror writers
English male screenwriters
Writers from Liverpool
Writers of books about writing fiction
Writers of Doctor Who novels
Deaths from throat cancer
Deaths from cancer in England